The 2009 OFC Under 17 tournament was the 13th edition of the OFC Under 17 Qualifying Tournament which took place between 20 and 24 April 2009 in New Zealand. The winner was New Zealand who were the Oceania Football Confederation representative at the 2009 FIFA U-17 World Cup in Nigeria.

The round-robin tournament was moved from Fiji in February after extensive rain.

Participating teams
 (host)

Matches

Goal scorers
3 goals
 Andrew Milne (NZL)
 Heirarii Tevenae (TAH)

2 goals
 Kaurani Voirin (TAH)

1 goal

 Louis Manakeen (NCL)
 Jules Patruel (NCL)
 Stephane Wahaga (NCL)
 Jamie Doris (NZL)
 Jack Hobson-McVeigh (NZL)
 Gordon Murie (NZL)
 Zane Sole (NZL)
 Raimana Dahlluin (TAH)
 Hiva Kamoise (TAH)
 Heitini Tupea (TAH)
 Teaonui Tehau (TAH)
 Moken Maltungtung (VAN)

Winner

External links
OFC CONFIRMS VENUE SWITCH 

Under 17
OFC
2009
2009
2009 in youth association football